Pashupatinagar is a neighborhood in Suryodaya Municipality of Ilam District of Province No. 1 in Nepal.  Previously it was a separate Village Development Committee  in Ilam District in the Province No. 1 of Nepal. Pashupatinagar was Incorporated with Suryodaya municipality in 2017 and divided into two wards. The ward no. 2 and 3.

Demographics
At the time of the 2011 Nepal census it had a population of 29,0082 persons living in 1980 individual households.

Transport
Pashupatinagar is near Nepal's eastern border at Darjeeling District, West Bengal State, India.  There is a border crossing to Sukhiapokhri town with a customs checkpoint.  Indian and Nepalese nationals cross without restriction.

References

External links
UN map of the municipalities of Ilam District

Populated places in Ilam District
Transit and customs posts along the India–Nepal border